Lonesome Luke, Messenger is a 1917 American short comedy film starring Harold Lloyd.

Plot
Lonesome Luke and Snub are employed as bicycle messengers.  One of their assignments is to deliver several packages to an all-girls boarding school.  Luke is quickly hustled out of the building after he sees the large amount of young ladies there.  Luke and Snub create chaotic scenes trying to reenter the school as assistants to a burly wallpaper hanger.

Cast
 Harold Lloyd – Lonesome Luke
 Bebe Daniels
 Snub Pollard
 Gilbert Pratt
 Gus Leonard
 Fred C. Newmeyer
 Billy Fay
 Nina Speight
 Bud Jamison
 Charles Stevenson
 Dorothea Wolbert
 May Ballard – (as Mabel Ballard)
 Evelyn Page
 W.L. Adams
 Sammy Brooks

See also
 Harold Lloyd filmography

References

External links

1917 films
1917 short films
American silent short films
1917 comedy films
American black-and-white films
Films directed by Hal Roach
Silent American comedy films
Lonesome Luke films
American comedy short films
1910s American films